National Sun Yat-sen University (NSYSU) is a public research-intensive university renowned as an official think tank scholars' community, located in Sizihwan, Kaohsiung, Taiwan. NSYSU is listed as one of six national research universities, and one of four universities that make up the Taiwan Comprehensive University System, a research-led university alliance in Taiwan. With AACSB and CFA accredited and the number one maritime management program in Asia, the NSYSU College of Management is among the best in East Asia, and the College of Marine Sciences is the oldest and highest ranked in Taiwan.

The first national comprehensive university in Southern Taiwan, NSYSU was founded in response to national development needs. The alumni of both the original Sun Yat-sen University and the historical Moscow Sun Yat-sen University also have contributed to the establishment of the university. In the beginning, each the Sun Yat-sen Universities adopted a statism educational model based-on Dr. Sun Yat-sen's philosophy. At present, NSYSU is a regular public university, and known for its political and commercial relations, its faculty and staff serve as bureaucrats and NGO experts to maintain close contact with industry and government officials. NSYSU hosts the European Union Centre, America Center, and the Center for Japanese Studies.

NSYSU usually is ranked among the top 6-7 universities nationally and among the top 400-1000 universities worldwide, it is organized into eight colleges, two National Key Fields colleges, but it also contains a considerable number of research institutes.

History
In 1980,as Taiwan's overall economic development took off, the community's concern and attention to higher education grew. In order to balance the development of education in the north and south, the government decided to build a comprehensive university in the south.

When NSYSU was re-established, the university had four departments, two graduate institutes, and 189 students. In 2002, NSYSU was named by the Ministry of Education as one of the country's seven major research-intensive universities. Two years later, the College of Management became the nation's first Association to Advance Collegiate Schools of Business accredited public university. In addition, NSYSU received a first/second stage grant from the "Aim for the Top University Plan" from the Ministry of Education in 2011 and 2016. 

Since 2012, NSYSU held the 1st "NSYSU & UCSD Joint Symposium" on international academic cooperation. In the final two months of 2014, Nobel laureates Akira Suzuki and Hiroshi Amano visited the university.

NSYSU has 10 colleges, namely Liberal Arts, Sciences, Engineering, Management, Marine Sciences, Social Sciences, Si-Wan, Medicine, Semiconductor and Advanced Technology Research, and International Finance. These colleges have more than 10,000 students.

In 2021, the American Institute in Taiwan (AIT) official statement affirmed that NSYSU, as one of Taiwan's top universities, is also an important promoter of US-Taiwan relations.

Campus culture

National Sun Yat-sen University is located in Kaohsiung City, the largest port city of Taiwan. Based on an academic style that emphasizes ocean and commerce, it not only is the birthplace of Taiwan's first college of maritime sciences but also is unique in hosting water sports activities directly on campus. NSYSU's graduation requirements for its students include demonstration of swimming ability. NSYSU also has a regular windsurfing competition relationship with prestigious Osaka University in Japan. Furthermore, NSYSU has a special sister school relationship with the University of California, San Diego (UCSD) in the United States, a research university with a similar academic style, and which also is located near a coast. NSYSU & UCSD Joint Symposium has been held in Kaohsiung and La Jolla alternately every year since 2015.

The university is the birthplace of the first Sinophone bulletin board system and popular Asian cultural terms "ACG". In addition, NSYSU will be transformed into an English-taught university by 2030.

Campus and facilities

Campus

Sizihwan

Located alongside the Kaohsiung Harbor and a military base, the NSYSU campus is surrounded on three sides by mountains and also faces the open waters of the Taiwan Strait, thus making it a natural fortress. The Sizihwan beach (one of Eight Views of Taiwan) is located right on campus which makes the university campus a very attraction location in Taiwan. The environmental characteristics are unique in the country, including the nature of the montane ecosystem, marine ecosystem, and coral reefs. In addition to the university buildings on the campus, there is also a seaside resort, a stadium constructed by land reclamation, Sizihwan Tunnel, and historic places remaining from the Japanese ruling era.

The campus is close to the downtown but far away from congestion and noise of the city. There are only four roads connecting the campus to the outside city, all the lanes are close to the mountains and the sea, and the terrain is challenging. NSYSU faculty and students live amongst a variety of wildlife. There are a large number of Formosan rock macaques, cockatoos, Pallas's squirrels, and Reeves's muntjacs, and the campus area is rich in natural ecology. However, a nearly daily occurrence involves macaques snatching food from students and breaking into dormitories and classrooms. In addition, the Sizihwan waters are inhabited by the endangered coral species Polycyanthus chiashanensis, with only about 50 remaining.

Sizihwan historic places 

Imperial Guesthouse
From April 21 to 22, 1923, Prince Hirohito visited the Takao Port to inspect Kongō Maru. He lived in the Takao Mountain Guesthouse  a.k.a. Takao Imperial Guesthouse , which was newly built. In order to celebrate the birthday of Prince Hirohito on April 29, Den Kenjirō, the Governor-General of Taiwan, renamed the Kotobuki-yama Hotel . After the Government of the Republic of China took over Taiwan, Kotobuki-yama territory became a military control district, and then Guesthouse was dismantled. The site is now a dormitory for faculty and staff of National Sun Yat-sen University.

Sizihwan Tunnel
Sizihwan Tunnel was completed in October 1928, and it was called Kotobuki-yama Do , connecting Sizihwan of that time and downtown Takao. Currently, it connects National Sun Yat-sen University and Hamasen.

Sizihwan Guesthouse of Chiang Kai-shek
In 1937, the Imperial Japanese Navy built a two-story building named Takao Sightseeing Hall . After the R.O.C. government took over Taiwan, it became one of Guesthouses of Chiang Kai-shek. President Chiang Kai-shek and his madame lived at the Guesthouse each time they traveled to southern Taiwan. In 1980, the building was transferred to National Sun Yat-sen University, and in 1999 it was given another name, Sizihwan Art Gallery. In 2004, the gallery was designated as a Kaohsiung City Historic Site.

Renwu
Renwu campus will be built on 24 hectares of campus, with three areas planned for AI medicine, intelligent health care and ecological recreation, provide research space for the Institute of Precision Medicine, the Institute of Biotechnology and Medicine, the Institute of Medical Technology, and the Institute of Biomedical Research.
In December 2020,this Campus completed 24 hectares of land preparation operations, including base elevation adjustment, drainage facilities for detention ponds, tree clearing and greening, etc. The medical teaching building is planned to be a 1-floor underground building and 6-floor above ground building, covering an area of 3,160 pings.

Pratas Island

In 2012 NSYSU Dongsha Atoll Research Station (DARS) was established for biology, biogeochemistry, and oceanography research.

Sri Lanka
The Taiwan and Sri Lanka Environmental Change Sciences and Technology Innovation Center (TS/ECSTIC) is located in Sri Lanka. The Western Long-term Observation Station is located at the University of Sri Jayewardenepura in the capital; the Southern Long-term Observation Station is located at the University of Ruhuna in Matara.

Academics

Colleges 
NSYSU has eight colleges:
 Engineering
 Liberal Arts
 Management
 Marine Sciences
 Medicine
 Science
 Social Sciences
 Si-Wan

National Key Fields Colleges 
NSYSU has  two National Key Fields colleges established based on the special decree National Key Fields Industry-University Cooperation and Skilled Personnel Training: 
 College of Semiconductor and Advanced Technology Research
 School of International Finance

Research
Despite its small-to-medium size, National Sun Yat-sen University has always had outstanding research capabilities. The "Asia Pacific Ocean Research Center" at NSYSU is a world-class Kuroshio research center, it possesses the most advanced marine current power generation technology worldwide. The "Electronic Commerce and Internet Society Research Center" at NSYSU is the only social science research center in Taiwan that has been selected for the European Commission's 7th Framework Programme (FP7) SSH-NCP.

As of 2017, NSYSU had 68 research centers,  including the following most important key centers:

Top level
Asia Pacific Ocean Research Center
Electronic Commerce and Internet Society Research Center
Large-scale multi-antenna system Research center
Functional Crystalline Amorphous Complex Research Center
Medical Science and Technology Center
Centre for Humanities Innovation and Social Practices

University level
Sun Yat-sen Research Center for Social Science
Multidisciplinary and Data Science Research Center (MDSRC)
Management Studies Research Center
Engineer Technology Research & Promotion Center
Frontier Center for Ocean Science and Technology
Center for the Humanities

Rankings
National Sun Yat-sen University has been ranked consistently among the top 7 universities nationally in QS World University Rankings, Times Higher Education World University Rankings, and Academic Ranking of World Universities.

QS World University Rankings
According to QS World University Rankings (2022), NSYSU is the 7th-ranked university in Taiwan (412rd worldwide).

Times Higher Education
According to Times Higher Education (2022), NSYSU is the 7th-ranked university in Taiwan (201-250th Asia; 810-1000th worldwide).

Academic Ranking of World Universities
According to Academic Ranking of World Universities (2021), NSYSU ranks #7 among Taiwan's national universities (601-700th worldwide).
Mathematics: 75-100th, 1st in Taiwan (2015).
Oceanography: 101-150th, 2nd in Taiwan (2020) 
Engineering: 101-150th (2016)
Computer science: 151-200th (2015)
Telecommunication Engineering: 151-200th (2020)

THE 100 Under 50 university rankings
According to Times Higher Education ranking of the 100 best universities under the age of 50 (2020), NSYSU ranks as the 6th university in Taiwan (201-250th worldwide).

THES - QS World University Rankings
According to the THES - QS World University Rankings, NSYSU ranks among the world's 500 best universities, ranked at 401+ (2009).

Global Views Monthly Taiwan University Rankings
In the 2021 list, NSYSU ranks 6th among comprehensive universities. In addition:
5th in social prestige
6th in industry-university cooperation
7th in internationalization

Financial Times - Executive MBA Ranking
According to Financial Times (2017), NSYSU's Global EMBA programme ranked 69th in the 2017 Financial Times Executive MBA rankings, the only ranked institution from Taiwan.

Eduniversal World TOP 300 Business School
According to Eduniversal, among the ranked fields, NSYSU's maritime management ranks first in Asia.

{| class="wikitable"
|-  style="background:#efefef; text-align:center;"
|  style="width:50px; "| Taiwan
|  style="width:100px; "| Business School Level
|  style="width:100px; "| 2014 Recommendation Rate (per 1000) 
|  style="width:400px; "| School
|-
|  style="width:50px; text-align:center;"| 1
|  style="width:100px; text-align:center;"| UNIVERSAL
|  style="width:100px; text-align:center;"| 252 ‰
|  style="width:400px; text-align:center;"| National Taiwan University - College of Management
|-
|  style="width:50px; text-align:center;"| 2
|  style="width:100px; text-align:center;"| TOP
|  style="width:100px; text-align:center;"| 164 ‰
|  style="width:400px; text-align:center;"| National Chengchi University - College of Commerce
|- style="text-align:center;" 
|  style="width:50px; "| 3
|  style="width:100px; "| EXCELLENT
|  style="width:100px; "| 140 ‰
|  style="width:400px; "| National Sun Yat-sen University - College of Management
|-
|  style="width:50px; text-align:center;"| 4
|  style="width:100px; text-align:center;"| EXCELLENT
|  style="width:100px; text-align:center;"| 104 ‰
|  style="width:400px; text-align:center;"| Taiwan Tech - School of Management
|-
|  style="width:50px; text-align:center;"| 5
|  style="width:100px; text-align:center;"| EXCELLENT
|  style="width:100px; text-align:center;"| 60 ‰
|  style="width:400px; text-align:center;"| Fu Jen Catholic University - College of Management
|-
|  style="width:50px; text-align:center;"| 6
|  style="width:100px; text-align:center;"| EXCELLENT
|  style="width:100px; text-align:center;"| 56 ‰
|  style="width:400px; text-align:center;"| National Chiao Tung University - College of Management
|-
|  style="width:50px; text-align:center;"| 7
|  style="width:100px; text-align:center;"| GOOD
|  style="width:100px; text-align:center;"| 72 ‰
|  style="width:400px; text-align:center;"| National Cheng Kung University - College of Management
|}

19th worldwide (2nd in Taiwan) in Public Administration/Management.
24th worldwide (1st in Asia) in Maritime Management.
91st worldwide (1st in Taiwan) in Health Management
6th in Far East Asia (1st in Taiwan) in Human Resources Management
9th in Far East Asia (1st in Taiwan) in Corporate Communication
15th in Far East Asia (1st in Taiwan) in Information Systems Management
23rd in Far East Asia in Corporate Finance
28th in Far East Asia in Executive MBA

Distinctive government think tanks

The US, EU, and Japanese offices
Founded under the auspices of the United States government, European Commission, and Japanese government: the Sun Yat-sen American Center (est.1999), European Union Centre at NSYSU (est.2009), and Center for Japanese Studies at NSYSU (est.2010) are Southern Taiwan's only official office for political and academic exchanges.

Lee Teng-hui Center for Governmental Studies
Named in honor of former Taiwanese president Lee Teng-hui, the " Lee Teng-hui Center for Governmental Studies" established on February 1, 2017 (succeeding the "Dr. Teng-Hui Lee Political Economy Seminar," founded in 2002). The center serves as a regional think tank, with the purpose of providing prescient and integrated research or advice for governmental policies and social issues.

Center for Market Research and Public Opinion Polling
The Center at NSYSU is the most important social science research center and public opinion survey unit in Southern Taiwan. The Center and National Chengchi University's Election Study Center are listed as Taiwan's two major university polling institutions.

International Exchange
Every year there are about 50 international exchange students who come to study, primarily in management and business-focused areas taught in English. They also learn about Taiwanese culture as well as some varieties of Chinese language. The university also has a separate language institute where fee-paying students can study Taiwanese and Mandarin. There also are a similar number of out-going exchange students who travel each year to NSYSU's partner universities. NSYSU has an active International Student Association. In 2009-2010 well over 250 international students were members of the ISA association at NSYSU, participating in over 20 student events. ISA has five key points: Student Services, Public Services, Social Events, Sports, and Scholarship. The 2010-2011 International Student Executive Board will tentatively be elected in the fall of 2010 at NSYSU. The Office of International Affairs at NSYSU traditionally has monitored the election process.

Taiwan's first P.R.C. and Burkina Faso student to receive a doctorate are both graduates of NSYSU Institute of China and Asia-Pacific Studies.

Notable alumni
More see List in Chinese version

NSYSU graduates include the President of the Legislative Yuan Su Jia-chyuan, the Mayor of Kaohsiung Chen Chu, Member of the Pennsylvania House of Representatives David H. Rowe, and a sizable number of CEOs from among the 500 largest companies in the world, such as John Lin, the Vice President of eBay, Yuei-An Liou, a space scientist and distinguished professor, and chairman of the Financial Supervisory Commission Huang Tien-mu.

Legislators
Member of Legislative Yuan

Chiu Chih-wei
Chung Shao-ho

Hsu Chih-ming
Hsu Jung-shu
Huang Chao-shun

Liu Chun-hsiung

Lin Yi-shih
Lwo Shih-hsiung
Pan Men-an

Yu Chen Yueh-ying

And others: Ng Hong-mun (Guangdong period), Lin Ruo (Guangdong period)

Others
Hwang Yau-tai (Guangdong period)
Yang Huimin (Guangdong period)
Yang Cho-cheng
Lo Chih-chiang

Honorary doctorate
As of June 2021, there are a total of 24 people. For the full list, please refer to the announcement of the Academic Affairs Office of National Sun Yat-sen University.

2019 Information Security Incident
NSYSU experienced a serious information security incident in November 2019. It is suspected that overseas hackers from China used XSS to monitor the email boxes of nearly 100 faculty members of NSYSU's College of Social Sciences and the College of Marine Sciences.

Because the primary victims (politics, Cross-Strait relations, and public policy scholars) are associated with government think tanks, the invasion may have introduced a threat to national security.

Affiliated school
 Guoguang Laboratory School, National Sun Yat-sen University Homepage

Alliance
 EUTW university alliance
 Taiwan Comprehensive University System
 Alliance with Kaohsiung Medical University

Partner institutions
University of California, San Diego (UCSD), the United States
Waseda University School of Social Sciences, Japan

See also

 List of universities in Taiwan
 Sun Yat-sen University (disambiguation)
 Sun Yat-sen University in Guangzhou, China
 Moscow Sun Yat-sen University in Moscow, Soviet Union

References

External links

 National Sun Yat-sen University Reviews - Kaohsiung, Taiwan Attractions - TripAdvisor
 Lee Teng-hui Center for Governmental Studies

 
Educational institutions established in 1980
1980 establishments in Taiwan
Universities and colleges in Taiwan
Universities and colleges in Kaohsiung
Comprehensive universities in Taiwan
Oceanographic organizations